Lawrence Solomon is a Canadian writer on the environment and the executive director of Energy Probe, a Canadian non-governmental environmental policy organization, and a member of the advisory board of the far-right Rebel News. His writing has appeared in a number of newspapers, including The National Post where he has a column, and he is the author of several books on energy resources, urban sprawl,  and global warming, among them The Conserver Solution (1978), Energy Shock (1980), Toronto Sprawls: A History (2007), and The Deniers (2008).

Solomon opposes nuclear power based on its economic cost, has promoted climate change denial, and has been critical of government approaches and policies used to address environmental concerns.<ref>For his views on nuclear power, see Solomon, Lawrence. [http://www.financialpost.com/opinion/story.html?id=0436ed83-26ae-4b7f-8bd3-6897a45ac831&p=2 "The two blows that killed the industry] , The National Post, August 1, 2001.
For his approach to global warming, see Humen, Brit, and Hill, Martin.  "Is the Earmark System Really Being Reformed by Democrats?" , Fox News, June 4, 2007.
Also see "Lawrence Solomon biography", The National Post, and List of Solomon articles, The National Post, accessed August 2, 2010.</ref>

Career and environmental activities
Solomon writes that he was an adviser to President Jimmy Carter's task force on the environment in the late 1970s, which released The Global 2000 Report to the President in 1980. He has a regular column in The National Post, and has written for The Globe and Mail, National Review Online, CBS News, and The Wall Street Journal. He was the editor and publisher of the defunct Next City magazine."The Next City magazine, published and edited by Solomon, was started in 1995." Thomas Walkom Hydro thorn Energy Probe rooted on the right; Pro-privatization empire not part of environmentalism's whole-grain world August 23, 1997 page E.1 Toronto Star  He has also written for American Forests, an environmental conservation organization.

Serving as executive director of the Urban Renaissance Institute, a division of Energy Probe, Solomon has advocated environmental protection, conservation, and safeguards throughout the world, especially in non-affluent nations.  He supports reforms in foreign aid, putting a stop to nuclear power expansion, and supports the privatization of transport projects and the expansion of toll roads. "I note that Lawrence Solomon continues to advocate road tolls, and the privatization of the TTC (like London) for Toronto's transportation system." Bruce Campion-Smith  In his columns and his book Toronto Sprawls: A History, he blames government policy for exacerbating and encouraging sprawl.  He is a critic of subsidies to rural Canada, and has criticized Ontario Hydro's actions and projects and their effects on Canada's environment. He writes that he was very active during the 1970s and 1980s with Energy Probe in opposing attempts to expand the use of nuclear power in Canada.

Global warming
In a series of articles and a companion book published in 2008, The Deniers, Solomon writes about scientists whose views and research promote a contrarian view of global warming in opposition to the consensus of thirty four National Academies of Science, the WMO and the IPCC. Reviews of the book have appeared in the Washington Times, Vancouver Sun, Alternatives Journal, and other publications.  A number of reviewers point out that most of the scientists profiled in the book do not actually deny climate change. These reviewers characterize the book as containing selective quotes of scientists' disagreements on the details of climate change in order to present the impression that there is no consensus on climate change. In fact, despite the title, they report that Solomon acknowledges in the book that "I … noticed something striking about my growing cast of deniers. None of them were deniers."

Solomon's blog has been mentioned in U.S. News & World Report's website concerning carbon emissions reduction legislation.

Clash of civilizations
On December 29, 2010, Solomon predicted a "clash of civilizations between Islam and the west," over the secession of southern Sudan. He predicted that northern Sudan would reject the secession, which would then pit "a club of non-Islamic nations" (including what he calls "Christian Kenya", "Christian Ethiopia" and Israel) against Islamic ones (including Iran).

Green Beanery
In 2004, Solomon founded Green Beanery, a non-profit online merchant specializing in organic coffee beans produced by small, independent farmers. The company is located in downtown Toronto and includes a cafe where customers can sample a wide variety of coffee. The cafe opened in 2008 and closed in March 2020; the online business is to continue. The profits from Green Beanery go to Probe International.

Published works
Solomon's books include:
 The Conserver Solution (Doubleday, 1978 )
 Energy shock: After the oil runs out (Doubleday, 1980 )
 Breaking up Ontario Hydro's Monopoly (Energy Probe, 1982)
 Power at What Cost (Doubleday, 1984 )
 In the Name of Progress (with Patricia Adams) (Earthscan, 1992 )
 Toronto Sprawls: A History (University of Toronto Press, 2007 )
 The Deniers: The world-renowned scientists who stood up against global warming hysteria, political persecution, and fraud (Richard Vigilante Books, 2008 )

References

External links
 Climate change: The Deniers provides an index to the series of articles by Solomon in the National Post about scientists who "buck the conventional wisdom on climate science."
 "Don’t Deny Yourself", an interview with Lawrence Solomon, in National Review, April 22, 2008.
 "A Time to Deny", an interview with Lawrence Solomon at The American Spectator, April 18, 2008.
 The climate change deniers, an article on Solomon's book The Deniers in The Washington Times, May 6, 2008.
 "The Deniers details flaws in the theories on global warming", The Vancouver Sun, May 9, 2008.  "An anti-nuclear, Toronto-based, urban-loving, 1970s peace activist who opposes subsidies to the oil industry might be the last person expected to detail cracks in the science of global warming...."
 climatescienceinternational.org Manhattan Declaration on Climate Change contains links to various articles by Solomon.
 
 Mark Milke, "Alberta to Bury Carbon, and its History", a Frontier Centre for Public Policy article dated 2008-07-16 referring to Lawrence Solomon's book The Deniers''.

1948 births
Living people
Non-fiction environmental writers
Canadian non-fiction writers
Canadian columnists
Canadian people of Romanian descent
National Post people